Eupithecia misturata is a moth in the family Geometridae first described by George Duryea Hulst in 1896. It is widely distributed in western North America.

The wingspan is about 16–18 mm. The forewings are pale gray, with a small black discal spot. Adults are on wing in summer.

The larvae feed on the foliage and flowers of various flowering trees and shrubs, including Holodiscus discolor, Ceanothus velutinus, Arctostaphylos and Quercus species.

Subspecies
Eupithecia misturata misturata (from southern California north to British Columbia and southern Alberta and east to the Rocky Mountains of Colorado, Utah and New Mexico)
Eupithecia misturata delzurata Cassino & Swett 1922 (California)

References

Moths described in 1896
misturata
Moths of North America